The 1995 NCAA Division III baseball tournament was played at the end of the 1995 NCAA Division III baseball season to determine the 20th national champion of college baseball at the NCAA Division III level. The tournament concluded with eight teams competing at a new location at Kiwanis Field in Salem, Virginia, for the championship. Eight regional tournaments were held to determine the participants in the World Series. Regional tournaments were contested in double-elimination format, with one region consisting of six teams, six regions consisting of four teams, and one region consisting of two teams, which was played as best-of-five, for a total of 32 teams participating in the tournament. LaVerne was the first West Coast team to win the Division III title since Cal State Stanislaus in 1977.

World Series
Kiwanis Field-Salem, VA

See also
 1995 NCAA Division I baseball tournament
 1995 NAIA World Series

References

NCAA Division III Baseball Tournament
Tournament